Kelvin Leerdam (born 24 June 1990) is a Surinamese professional footballer who plays as a right-back for LA Galaxy and the Suriname national team.

Club career

Early career
Leerdam was born in Paramaribo, the capital and largest city of Suriname. Leerdam has a close relationship with his mother and has one younger sister.

Leerdam started his career at local Utrecht club USV Elinkwijk. Feyenoord followed the midfielder for many years and eventually joined the Feyenoord youth academy in the season 2005–06.

Coming from an amateur side, Leerdam had a difficult start in the Feyenoord youth. The first two seasons he was mainly used as a substitute. Leerdam joined a successful generation in Feyenoord U17, where he had to compete with players like Leroy Fer, Georginio Wijnaldum and Kevin Wattamaleo for a place on the midfield. After two years, when other players took their chance on a higher level, Leerdam became a regular starter in the U19 team. Thanks to his hard work and dedication, Leerdam eventually made it to Feyenoord's first team squad as well. In January 2007, Leerdam was invited to the first team's training camp in Belek, Turkey, by Feyenoord manager Erwin Koeman. On 6 June 2008, Leerdam signed his first professional contract until 2011.

Feyenoord
Leerdam had his breakthrough in the season 2008–09. On 13 November 2008, Leerdam made his official debut in Feyenoord's first team. Leerdam replaced Karim El Ahmadi in the 69th minute of the KNVB Cup 5–1 away win against HHC Hardenberg. Leerdam made his Eredivisie debut on 16 November 2008. Leerdam replaced Georginio Wijnaldum in the 87th minute in the away match against FC Twente (1–1). On 27 November 2008, Leerdam also made his European debut. In the UEFA Cup away match against Deportivo la Coruña (3–0), Leerdam replaced Karim El Ahmadi in the 56th minute.

On 1 February 2009, Leerdam had a place in the starting line-up for the first time. When Giovanni van Bronckhorst got injured during the warm-up before the Eredivisie match against N.E.C., Leerdam replaced him as left-back. On 12 April 2009, Leerdam made his first and only goal for Feyenoord, in the home match against Heracles Almelo.

In the season 2009–10, Leerdam was candidate to leave Feyenoord on loan for Excelsior. Because of the departure of the right-backs Theo Lucius, Serginho Greene and Dwight Tiendalli, Leerdam remained at Feyenoord and is mainly used as the stand-in for first team right-back Dani Fernández.

Vitesse
On 14 January 2013, he signed a pre-contract deal with Vitesse. On 2 July, it was announced that Leerdam signed a three-year deal with the Arnhem club. On 1 August 2013, Leerdam made his Vitesse debut in their UEFA Europa League qualifier tie against Petrolul Ploiești, in which Leerdam featured for the entire 90 minutes during the 1–1 draw. Three days later, Leerdam scored on his league debut for Vitesse in their 3–1 home victory over Heracles Almelo, netting the opener in the 27th minute. Leerdam went onto score eight times in total during the 2013–14 campaign and started to attract interest from Vitesse's feeder club, Chelsea during January 2014.

During the 2015–16 campaign, Leerdam was dropped by interim-manager Rob Maas for the foreseeable future after the full-back discredited Vitesse in a recent interview. Leerdam therefore, failed to feature again for Vitesse until the following campaign, when Rob Maas was replaced by Henk Fraser. On 31 March 2017, it was announced that Leerdam would leave Vitesse along with Arshak Koryan, Wouter Dronkers and Ewout Gouw at the end of their current deals in June 2017.

He played as Vitesse won the final of the KNVB Beker 2–0 against AZ Alkmaar on 30 April 2017 to lead the club, three-time runners up, to the title for the first time in its 125-year history.

Seattle Sounders FC
On 1 July 2017, Leerdam joined American side Seattle Sounders FC preceding his release from Vitesse.

On 10 November 2019, Leerdam scored the opening goal for Seattle in a 3–1 home win over Toronto FC in the 2019 MLS Cup Final, after his shot was deflected by Toronto defender Justin Morrow.

Inter Miami
On 23 March 2021, Leerdam joined fellow Major League Soccer club Inter Miami. Following the 2021 season, Leerdam's contract option was declined by Miami.

LA Galaxy
On 6 January 2022, Leerdamn signed with MLS side LA Galaxy on a two-year deal.

International career
Leerdam made his first appearance on international level in the Netherlands U19. The Dutch team missed out on a place at the 2009 UEFA European Under-19 Football Championship in Ukraine by the narrowest of margins. The Netherlands U19 finished second in the qualifying elite round behind Slovenia U19, with one goal difference.

Leerdam decided to represent Suriname, the country of his birth, at the senior level. He was called up to the Suriname national team for the first time in November 2019. He made his debut on 24 March 2021 in a World Cup qualifier against the Cayman Islands. On 25 June 2021 Leerdam was called up to the Suriname squad for the 2021 CONCACAF Gold Cup.

Career statistics

Club

International

Honours

Vitesse
 KNVB Cup: 2016–17

Seattle Sounders FC
 MLS Cup: 2019

References

External links
 Voetbal International profile 
 Official Kelvin Leerdam profile on Feyenoord.nl 
Netherlands stats at OnsOranje

1990 births
Living people
Sportspeople from Paramaribo
Surinamese footballers
Suriname international footballers
Dutch footballers
Dutch expatriate footballers
Netherlands youth international footballers
Netherlands under-21 international footballers
Surinamese emigrants to the Netherlands
Association football fullbacks
Association football midfielders
USV Elinkwijk players
Feyenoord players
SBV Vitesse players
Seattle Sounders FC players
Inter Miami CF players
LA Galaxy players
Eredivisie players
Major League Soccer players
Surinamese expatriate footballers
Surinamese expatriate sportspeople in the United States
Expatriate soccer players in the United States
2021 CONCACAF Gold Cup players